Flagey-Echézeaux is a commune in the Côte-d'Or department in eastern France.

Population

Wine

Flagey-Echézeaux is home to two Grand Cru vineyards, Échezeaux and Grands Échezeaux. Most of the other vineyards of the commune are part of the Vosne-Romanée appellation, and there is no "Flagey-Echézeaux" appellation.

See also
 Échezeaux
 Route des Grands Crus

References

Communes of Côte-d'Or
Côte-d'Or communes articles needing translation from French Wikipedia